Larry Dunne (February 1948-18 May 2020) was an Irish organised crime boss and drug dealer. He was held responsible for introducing heroin into Dublin in the 1970s.

Early life
He was born into a large inner-city Dublin family of 14, grew up in Dolphin's Barn and became involved in petty crime. He was sent to Daingean Reformatory like many of his brothers.

His father Christy "Bronco" Dunne Snr. had served eighteen months in Portlaoise Prison for manslaughter in 1939.

Criminal career
He began supplying heroin in Dublin in the late 1970s. He had spent time in England and built up a network of connections with British drug dealers. He organised young "runners" to supply heroin on streets and in flat complexes. Because of this he earned the nickname "Larry doesn't carry".

He made so much money that in May 1982 he was able to buy a luxury home in its own grounds in Sandyford at the foot of the Dublin Mountains. Although unemployed he paid £100,000 for it - the equivalent of €1.3 million in 2020 prices.

In June 1983 he was brought before the courts on drugs trafficking charges. After a morning testimony against him he absconded. He was found guilty in his absence. While on the run he hid in Crumlin, a house of friends in Leitrim, spent a few days in a Divine Light Mission commune, then went to the Costa del Sol followed by Portugal.

He was arrested in Portugal, extradited to Ireland and served 10 years of a 14 year sentence.

He was convicted in 2004 of dealing for an offence that occurred in 1999.

He had more than 40 criminal convictions.

Death
He had been ill with lung cancer for a long time and was rushed to hospital with self-inflicted knife wounds. He died in St. James's Hospital.

References

See also
Christy Kinahan
John Gilligan
Martin "Marlo" Hyland

1948 births
2020 deaths
Criminals from Dublin (city)
Irish gangsters
Irish drug traffickers
Irish crime bosses